Matchroom Sport is a sporting event promotions company founded by English entrepreneur Barry Hearn and run by Hearn and his son Eddie Hearn. It first came to attention in the sports of snooker and boxing and is also involved in pool, bowling, golf, fishing, darts, table tennis, poker and gymnastics. The company is based in Brentwood, Essex. Matchroom has broadcasting agreements in the United Kingdom with Sky Sports, the BBC and ITV.

History
Matchroom formed in 1982 concentrating on snooker management with the likes of Steve Davis, Dennis Taylor, and Jimmy White under contract. It sponsored two non-ranking tournaments, the Matchroom Professional Championship (1986–1988, restricted to its contracted players) and Matchroom League (1987–1994). A novelty song called "Snooker Loopy" by "Chas & Dave and The Matchroom Mob" reached number 6 in the UK Singles Chart in 1986, with five Matchroom players featured on backup vocals and in the video.

Hearn's first foray into boxing promotion was the Frank Bruno vs. Joe Bugner heavyweight clash in 1987 in front of 35,000 people at White Hart Lane.

The range of sports increased in 1994 with the Mosconi Cup, an event which sees teams from Europe and the United States compete in a 9-ball pool tournament. It has become a major event on the professional pool calendar.

Over the years, Matchroom's portfolio under Hearn grew, taking a majority stake in the Professional Darts Corporation in 2001, helping oversee a growth in the sport.  Matchroom Sport also promote the World Cup of Pool, a national team  event, and the World Pool Masters, an annual nine-ball event.

In 2002, the company formed PGA EuroPro Tour, the UK's leading developmental golf tour, in association with the PGA. Later, in the 2000s, came ten pin bowling's Weber Cup. In 2009, Barry Hearn became the majority shareholder in World Snooker Tour Ltd. Since then the sport has grown, with prize money increased and new events introduced worldwide.

More recently, Matchroom has launched the World Championship of Ping Pong, Superstars of Gymnastics, British Basketball All-Stars, and British Fast5 Netball All-Stars.

In April 2021, Barry Hearn stepped down as chairman with his son Eddie taking over the role. Barry will continue as president in an advisory role, while Eddie takes over as head of the PGA EuroPro tour, alongside overseeing Matchroom's wider operations and continuing to head the boxing division.

Boxing

Current stable

References

External links
Matchroom Sport homepage

Leisure companies of the United Kingdom
Sports event promotion companies
Snooker event promotion companies
Boxing promoters